The 1864 United States presidential election in Massachusetts took place on November 8, 1864, as part of the 1864 United States presidential election. Voters chose 12 representatives, or electors to the Electoral College, who voted for president and vice president.

Massachusetts voted for the National Union candidate, Abraham Lincoln, over the Democratic candidate, George B. McClellan. Lincoln won the state by a margin of 44.44%.

Although Lincoln ran under the National Union banner, this is the best Republican performance in Massachusetts as of the 2020 election. With 72.22% of the popular vote, Lincoln's performance in Massachusetts made it his third best performance in the 1864 election after Kansas and neighboring Vermont.

Results

See also
 United States presidential elections in Massachusetts

References

Massachusetts
1864
1864 Massachusetts elections